Jean-Pierre Boris is a journalist at Radio France Internationale (RFI) since 1982.

From 1998 to 2005, Boris was the station's commodities correspondent and hosted a daily show on the topic. The show explored the geopolitical role of commodities and globalization. In 2005, Boris published the book Unfair Trade: The Black Book of commodities.

Works 
Commerce inéquitable: Le roman noir des matières premières. (2005) Paris: Hachette Littératures.
Main basse sur le riz

References

Living people
French radio presenters
French journalists
Year of birth missing (living people)
French male non-fiction writers